John Hinds may refer to:

John Hinds (politician) (1862–1928), Welsh businessman and politician
John Hinds (doctor) (1980–2015), British motorcycle trauma doctor
John Thomas Hinds (1866–1938), gospel preacher, teacher and evangelist for the Churches of Christ